Martín Koppel is one of the leaders of the Socialist Workers Party in the United States.

Early life
Before joining the staff of the SWP's paper The Militant in 1991, he was a steelworker in Chicago and member of the United Steelworkers of America union.

Career
Koppel is a Communist political organizer, a native of Argentina who grew up in the United States. Koppel first became involved in political activism while an exchange student in Marseille, France. The next year, in 1977, he joined the Socialist Workers Party in Baltimore.

He has been active in defense of the Cuban Revolution, and was a longtime supporter of Puerto Rican independence. Koppel has also traveled extensively in Latin America and the Caribbean to take part in political conferences and meet workers and peasants, from the Movement of Rural Landless Workers in Brazil to working class protests in Argentina, Mexico, the Dominican Republic, Nicaragua, and Grenada.

Writings
Koppel is the author of Peru's Shining Path: Evolution of a Stalinist Sect, published by Pathfinder Press in 1994.

Political career

2004 election

In 2004, Koppel ran for the US Senate seat from New York against Chuck Schumer.  He received 14,811 for 0.2 percent of the vote.

2006 election

In 2006 Koppel ran for attorney general of New York. He received 10,197 votes, for 0.2 percent of the total vote.

External links
The Militant, weekly paper reflecting the views of the Socialist Workers Party
Pathfinder Press

Year of birth missing (living people)
Living people
American political writers
American male non-fiction writers
Argentine emigrants to the United States
Maryland socialists
People from Baltimore
People from Chicago
Socialist Workers Party (United States) politicians from New York (state)
Writers from Chicago